The Armagh county football team represents Armagh GAA, the county board of the Gaelic Athletic Association, in the Gaelic sport of football. The team competes in the three major annual inter-county competitions; the All-Ireland Senior Football Championship, the Ulster Senior Football Championship and the National Football League.

Armagh's home ground is the Athletic Grounds, Armagh. The team's manager is Kieran McGeeney.

The team last won the Ulster Senior Championship in 2008, the All-Ireland Senior Championship in 2002 and the National League in 2005.

Colours and crest
Armagh's county colours are orange and white. Originally they wore black and amber striped shirts until 1926 when Dominican nuns from Omeath, in County Louth knitted the team a pair of orange and white kits ahead of a Junior clash with Dublin which they have kept since.

Kit evolution
Armagh launched a new kit in November 2022.

Team sponsorship
The Armagh County Board negotiated a number of new sponsorship deals in 2012, including telecommunications company Rainbow Communications as principal jersey sponsor, and Simply Fruit for the minor team. Previously, the county's main sponsor had been Morgan Fuels, but that 17-year relationship ended somewhat acrimoniously in 2012.

History
Armagh was the second team to win the Ulster Senior Football Championship, doing so in 1890. In the early years of the GAA, a club that won its county championship went on to represent the county and would also wear the county colours. Armagh Harps represented Armagh in the Ulster final, beating Tyrone (Cookstown's Owen Roes), but losing to All-Ireland Champions Cork (Midleton) in the All-Ireland SFC semi-final.

Despite early success at provincial level, national success at junior and minor level and All-Ireland final appearances in 1953 and 1977, it took until 2002 for Armagh to win their first and only All-Ireland Senior Football Championship under manager Joe Kernan. The county won the All-Ireland Minor Football Championship (MFC), in 1949 and again in 2009, but lost the 1957 All-Ireland Minor Football Championship final to Meath.

Joe Kernan scored two goals in the 1977 All-Ireland Senior Football Championship Final.

The Era of the Two Brians: 1995–2001

Joe Kernan's Golden Era: 2002–06
Joe Kernan is widely regarded as Armagh's most successful manager having won one League title, four Ulster SFCs and one All-Ireland SFC.

Appearing in the county's third All-Ireland SFC decider and having lost the previous two, the team was the first from Ulster to win an All-Ireland SFC since Down won the 1994 All-Ireland Senior Football Championship Final. Kerry had a four-point lead at half-time.

According to Eamonn Sweeney, "especially during their final years, Joe Kernan's Armagh came to epitomise a style of play with the emphasis on the physical, the kind of football which prompts machismo devotees in the media to break out phrases like 'grimly compelling' and 'ratcheting up the physical intensity.'"

Kernan–McGeeney interim: 2007–14
Peter McDonnell was appointed Armagh managed for the 2007–2009 seasons. During his time as Armagh manager, McDonnell won one Ulster SFC. After a disappointing 2009 campaign which resulted in Armagh being defeated by Tyrone, Peter McDonnell stepped down as Armagh manager.

Paddy O'Rourke, from the neighbouring county of Down, replaced McDonnell as Armagh manager between 2010 and 2012. During this time O'Rourke won the National Football League Division 2 title.

Paul Grimley replaced O'Rourke as Armagh manager for the 2013 and 2014 seasons. Grimley resigned following a one-point defeat to Donegal in the 2014 All-Ireland SFC quarter-final.

Kieran McGeeney era: 2015–
In August 2014, Kieran McGeeney took over as manager for an initial five-year term.

2015 season
In his first season as Armagh manager, McGeeney secured promotion to Division 2 of the National Football League after beating Fermanagh in the final.

In his first Ulster SFC game as manager, Donegal defeated Armagh on a scoreline of 0–8 to 2-11. Armagh's championship continued via the All-Ireland SFC qualifiers, in which the county defeated Wicklow but then Galway defeated it in Round 2.

2016 season
The 2016 NFL campaign ended with four teams finishing on the same points but by virtue of having a poor scoring difference Armagh were relegated to Division 3. In the 2016 Ulster SFC, Cavan defeated Armagh forcing Armagh to continue via the All-Ireland SFc qualifiers. This ended in defeat to Laois in Round 1.

2017 season
Armagh's 2017 NFL campaign ended with Tipperary beating Armagh in the last league game, this resulted in Armagh missing out on promotion back to Division 2.

In the 2017 Ulster SFC, Armagh went out to neighbouring team, Down. However, Armagh recovered with wins over Fermanagh, Westmeath, Tipperary and Kildare to book a place in an All-Ireland SFC quarter-final in which rivals Tyrone won through.

2018 season
Armagh started the 2018 season with promotion to Division 2 of the NFL but the county's Ulster SFC ended with a loss to Fermanagh at the quarter-final stage. Armagh continued its championship via the All-Ireland SFC qualifiers, in which the county defeated Westmeath, Sligo and Clare but was unable to overcome 2018 Connacht SFC finalists Roscommon.

2019 season
The 2019 campaign began with Armagh securing its Division 2 status. Armagh's 2019 Ulster SFC started off with a quarter-final win against neighbours Down, which would mark McGeeney's first win in Ulster as manager of Armagh. In the quarter-final Cavan and Armagh were inseparable in the first game but Cavan took the victory in the replay. In the All-Ireland SFC qualifiers, Armagh faced Monaghan, winning the game by a scoreline of 2–17 to 1–12. In Round 3 of the All-Ireland SFC qualifiers, Armagh lost to Mayo by one point.

In August 2019, McGeeney was given a two-year extension to his term as manager.

2020 season
Despite approaching the game as favourite, Armagh struggled to overcome Derry in a "gruelling" 2020 Ulster SFC quarter-final. The county then exited the Ulster SFC once more, this time after a "poor" showing at the semi-final stage, ten points down at half-time (Armagh only managed two points in the entire half) and twelve points the difference at the end. No All-Ireland SFC qualifiers occurred due to the COVID-19 pandemic. Thus ended Armagh's season.

2021 season
The 2021 season started with a reduced league where Armagh played against Monaghan, Tyrone and Donegal in the North division. Their first game back in division one was against Monaghan where Armagh would win 1-16 to 1-12 at Brewster Park. Next up Armagh played Tyrone losing by five points on a score of 2-10 to 2-15 and having to use five of their seven subs in the first half. In their closing match Armagh drew 1-16 a piece with Donegal who have managed to rack up big scores against Armagh in recent meetings. Although Armagh put in some good performance in division one it did not save them from having to go up against Roscommon in a relegation playoff. Armagh secured their division 1 status with a comfortable 1-17 to 0-11 win.

In August 2021, Armagh triggered the one-year option to retain McGeeney as manager for the 2022 season.

2022 season
The 2022 season had Armagh playing Galway in a 2022 All-Ireland SFC quarter-final at Croke Park. Tiernan Kelly and the eye-gouging incident caused uproar. Colm O'Rourke described Armagh as the "common denominator" after two earlier brawls in 2022, making this their third of the year. Joe Brolly condemned Armagh (like O'Rourke, he referred to Armagh's previous that season): "They are out of control and it is only a matter of time before someone gets very seriously injured. This was deliberate goading, deliberate assaults during the course of the game, way beyond what is acceptable. I invite the GAA to look at all the camera footage. They should be asking RTÉ for all of the camera footage, because a lot was missed yesterday. It's not good enough… There is, unfortunately, a culture within this Armagh squad and it's difficult to know if it is encouraged, but it is certainly being tolerated. This is the third time this season. And the most disappointing thing about (Sunday's) game is the number of occasions when you could clearly see an Armagh player setting out to injure an opponent… The eye-gouger, no doubt, will get 12 months as a minimum… Possibly longer than that. It is a scandal to see that in our games, deeply depressing. That is the third riot on the pitch that there has been associated with [Armagh's] games and it is not a coincidence."

Current management team
Appointed in August 2014, given two-year extension with one-year extra option in August 2019, some additions noted.
Manager: Kieran McGeeney
Backroom team: Kieran Donaghy (from December 2020) Ciaran McKeever; Ciaran McKinney
Assistant manager until the end of the 2020 season: Jim McCorry

Current panel

INJ Player has had an injury which has affected recent involvement with the county team.
RET Player has since retired from the county team.
WD Player has since withdrawn from the county team due to a non-injury issue.

Managerial history

The era of the two Brians 1995–2001

Joe Kernan's Golden Era 2002–2006

Peter McDonnell 2007–2009

Paddy O'Rourke 2010–2012

Paul Grimley 2013–2014

Kieran McGeeney 2015–present
[As of 13 June 2021]

National title-winning teams

Players

Notable players

Records
Stevie McDonnell is the team's top scorer in National Football League history, finishing his career with 33–282 (381) in that competition.

All Stars

Honours
Official honours, with additions noted.

National
All-Ireland Senior Football Championship
 Winners (1): 2002
 Runners-up (3): 1953, 1977, 2003
National Football League
 Winners (1): 2005
 Runners-up (3): 1982–83, 1984–85, 1993–94
All-Ireland Junior Football Championship
 Winners (1): 1926
All-Ireland Under-21 Football Championship
 Winners (1): 2004
All-Ireland Minor Football Championship
 Winners (2): 1949, 2009

Provincial
Ulster Senior Football Championship
 Winners (14): 1890, 1903, 1950, 1953, 1977, 1980, 1982, 1999, 2000, 2002, 2004, 2005, 2006, 2008
 Runners-up (20): 1891, 1901–02, 1904, 1912, 1917, 1920, 1927, 1928, 1931, 1932, 1934, 1938, 1939, 1949, 1954, 1961, 1981, 1984, 1987, 1990
Ulster Under-21 Football Championship
 Winners (2): 1998, 2004, 2007
Ulster Minor Football Championship
 Winners (11): 1930, 1949, 1951, 1953, 1954, 1957, 1961, 1968, 1992, 1994, 2005, 2009
Ulster Junior Football Championship
 Winners (6): 1925, 1926, 1935, 1948, 1951, 1985
Dr McKenna Cup
 Winners (9): 1929, 1931, 1938, 1939, 1949, 1950, 1986, 1990, 1994
Dr Lagan Cup
 Winners (3): 1954, 1955, 1956

References

External links
 

 
County football teams